Scree Peak is a conspicuous, flat-topped peak with talus-covered slopes, 560 m, standing at the northeast end of Eagle Island in Prince Gustav Channel, off the south coast of Trinity Peninsula. Discovered by the Falkland Islands Dependencies Survey (FIDS) and so named following their 1945 survey. The name is descriptive of the slopes of the peak.

Mountains of Trinity Peninsula